Actinidia  is a genus of woody and, with a few exceptions, dioecious plants native to temperate eastern Asia, occurring throughout most of China, Taiwan, Korea, and Japan, and extending north to southern areas of Russian Far East and south into Indochina.

The leaves are alternate and simple, with a dentated margin and a long petiole. The flowers are solitary or in axillary cymes, usually white, with five small petals. Most of the species are dioecious with separate male and female plants, but some are monoecious. The fruit is a large berry containing numerous small seeds; in most species, the fruit is edible. In particular, this genus is known for the species Actinidia deliciosa, one of the most common cultivated kiwifruits, and for the hardy ornamental A. kolomikta.

Fossil record
Fossils of the extinct species A. faveolata are known from Europe and Western Siberia extending from the Upper Oligocene to the Early Pleistocene.

Species 
The 40–60 species of Actinidia include:

Actinidia arguta – kokuwa, tara vine or hardy kiwi
A. arguta var. cordifolia
A. arguta var. giraldii
A. arguta var. nervosa
A. arguta var. purpurea
Actinidia arisanensis
Actinidia callosa
A. callosa var. acuminata
A. callosa var. discolor
A. callosa var. ephippioides
A. callosa var. formosana
A. callosa var. henryi
A. callosa var. strigillosa
Actinidia carnosifolia
A. carnosifolia var. glaucescens
Actinidia chengkouensis
Actinidia chinensis
A. chinensis var. hispida
A. chinensis var. jinggangshanensis
A. chinensis var. setosa
Actinidia chrysantha
Actinidia cinerascens
A. cinerascens var. longipetiolata
A. cinerascens var. tenuifolia
Actinidia cordifolia
Actinidia coriacea
Actinidia cylindrica
A. cylindrica f. obtusifolia
Actinidia deliciosa – kiwifruit, mi hou tao or Chinese gooseberry
Actinidia eriantha
Actinidia farinosa
Actinidia fasciculoides
A. fasciculoides var. cuneata
A. fasciculoides var. orbiculata
†Actinidia faveolata
Actinidia fortunatii
Actinidia foveolata
Actinidia fulvicoma
A. fulvicoma var. lanata
A. fulvicoma var. lanata f. arachnoidea
A. fulvicoma var. lanata f. hirsuta
A. fulvicoma var. pachyphylla
†Actinidia germanica
Actinidia glauco-callosa-callosa
Actinidia glaucophylla
A. glaucophylla var. asymmetrica
A. glaucophylla var. robusta
Actinidia globosa
Actinidia gracilis
Actinidia grandiflora
Actinidia hemsleyana
A. hemsleyana var. kengiana
Actinidia henryi
A. henryi var. glabricaulis
A. henryi var. polyodonta
Actinidia holotricha
Actinidia hubeiensis
Actinidia indochinensis
Actinidia kolomikta
Actinidia laevissima
Actinidia lanceolata
Actinidia latifolia
A. latifolia var. mollis
Actinidia leptophylla
Actinidia liangguangensis
Actinidia lijiangensis
Actinidia linguiensis
Actinidia longicarpa
Actinidia macrosperma
A. macrosperma var. mumoides
Actinidia maloides
A. maloides f. cordata
Actinidia melanandra
A. melanandra var. cretacea
A. melanandra var. glabrescens
A. melanandra var. kwangsiensis
A. melanandra var. subconcolor
Actinidia melliana
Actinidia obovata
Actinidia oregonensis
Actinidia persicina
Actinidia pilosula
Actinidia polygama – silver vine
Actinidia purpurea 
Actinidia rongshuiensis
Actinidia rubricaulis
A. rubricaulis var. coriacea
Actinidia rubus
Actinidia rudis
Actinidia rufa
Actinidia rufotricha
A. rufotricha var. glomerata
Actinidia sabiaefolia
Actinidia sorbifolia
Actinidia stellatopilosa
Actinidia styracifolia
Actinidia suberifolia
Actinidia tetramera
A. tetramera var. badongensis
Actinidia trichogyna
Actinidia ulmifolia
Actinidia umbelloides
A. umbelloides var. flabellifolia
Actinidia valvata
A. valvata var. boehmeriaefolia
Actinidia venosa
A. venosa f. pubescens
Actinidia vitifolia
Actinidia zhejiangensis

Uses 
Kiwifruit is a cultivar group of A. deliciosa, and hardy kiwi is the species Actinidia arguta, which has small fruit weighing , with green edible skins and green flesh; it is hardier than A. deliciosa. Some species are grown as ornamental plants, notably A. kolomikta.

In Japan, Actinidia polygama (silver vine) is noted for having an effect on cats much like that of catnip.  It is mentioned in the saying 猫にまたたび、女郎に小判 (neko ni matatabi, jorō ni koban, "silver vine to a cat, a coin to a prostitute"), meaning to put someone in a good mood by providing that which they most desire.

A. kolomikta is the hardiest species (to about -40 °C or -40 °F), and has distinctive white- and pink-variegated foliage even on wild plants, an unusual phenomenon. Its fruit is very small, weighing  or less.

Etymology
Actinidia is derived from Ancient Greek  'ray', and is a reference to the rayed styles of the flowers.

References

External links

 Images : Actinidia kolomikta (Maxim. et Rupr.) Maxim. - Flavon's Secret Flower Garden
 Characterization and phylogenetic analysis of the complete chloroplast genome of Actinidia latifolia (Actinidiaceae) — chloroplastic phylogeny of some species

 
Ericales genera
Extant Eocene first appearances
Dioecious plants